Only players born on or after 1 January 1984 are eligible to play.

Players in bold have now been capped at full international level.

Group A

Head coach: Jean-François De Sart

Head coach: Guy Levy

Head coach: Foppe de Haan

Head coach: José Couceiro

Group B

Head coach: Ladislav Škorpil

Head coach: Stuart Pearce

Statistics up to and including England 5–0 , 5 June 2007.

David Bentley was named in the squad, but on 7 June, after the closing date for squad announcements, withdrew citing exhaustion, leaving England with a squad of 22.

Head coach: Pierluigi Casiraghi

Head coach: Miroslav Đukić

Footnotes

Squads
UEFA European Under-21 Championship squads